Rosemarie Braddock DeWitt (born October 26, 1971) is an American actress. DeWitt played Emily Lehman in the Fox television series Standoff (2006–07), co-starring with her future husband Ron Livingston, as well as Charmaine Craine on United States of Tara. She also was the title character in 2008's Rachel Getting Married, garnering several awards and nominations for best supporting actress. She starred in the horror/thriller Poltergeist (2015), a remake of the 1982 film of the same name.

Early life
DeWitt was born in Flushing, Queens, New York, the daughter of Rosemarie (Braddock) and Kenny DeWitt. She is a granddaughter of former World Heavyweight Champion James J. Braddock, and played the role of neighbor Sara Wilson in the film Cinderella Man, which depicted James J. Braddock's life.

DeWitt lived in Hanover Township, New Jersey, and is a graduate of Whippany Park High School. She performed in several high school productions. She attended the New College at Hofstra University where she received a Bachelor of Arts in creative studies. While at Hofstra University, she also joined Alpha Phi. She had additional training at The Actors Center in New York.

Career
 

In 2016, DeWitt appeared in Damien Chazelle's musical romance La La Land opposite Ryan Gosling and Emma Stone. Other film credits include Jason Reitman's Men, Women, & Children, Michael Cuesta's Kill the Messenger opposite Jeremy Renner, Gus Van Sant's Promised Land opposite Matt Damon, Lynn Shelton's Your Sister's Sister opposite Emily Blunt and Mark Duplass, and Jonathan Demme's Rachel Getting Married. DeWitt appeared in the indie-thriller Sweet Virginia, directed by Jamie Dagg, which premiered at the 2017 Tribeca Film Festival. In 2018, DeWitt starred opposite Danny McBride in Arizona as well as in the second episode in the fourth season of the British series Black Mirror for director Jodie Foster.

On television, DeWitt was seen in three seasons of the Showtime comedy series United States of Tara alongside Toni Collette. In addition to her role on United States of Tara, DeWitt also recurred on the AMC series Mad Men, playing Midge Daniels, Don Draper's (Jon Hamm) bohemian mistress, in the show's first season.

Filmography

Awards 
Rachel Getting Married

 Santa Barbara International Film Festival: Virtuoso Award
 Satellite Award for Best Supporting Actress – Motion Picture
 Toronto Film Critics Association Award for Best Supporting Actress
 Utah Film Critics Association Award for Best Supporting Actress
 Vancouver Film Critics Circle Award for Best Supporting Actress
 Washington D.C. Area Film Critics Association Award for Best Supporting Actress
 Nominated – Broadcast Film Critics Association Award for Best Cast
 Nominated – Chicago Film Critics Association Award for Best Supporting Actress
 Nominated – Dallas-Fort Worth Film Critics Association Award for Best Supporting Actress
 Nominated – Detroit Film Critics Society Award for Best Supporting Actress
 Nominated – Detroit Film Critics Society Award for Best Newcomer
 Nominated – Gotham Independent Film Award for Best Ensemble Cast
 Nominated – Gotham Independent Film Award for Breakthrough Actor
 Nominated – Independent Spirit Award for Best Supporting Female
 Nominated – International Cinephile Society Award for Best Supporting Actress
 Nominated – New York Film Critics Circle Award for Best Supporting Actress 

Your Sister's Sister

 Gotham Independent Film Award for Best Ensemble Performance
 Nominated – Chlotrudis Award for Best Supporting Actress
 Nominated – Independent Spirit Award for Best Supporting Female
 Nominated – International Cinephile Society Award for Best Supporting Actress

References

External links

 
 
 DeWitt Biography AMCTV.com Madmen

1971 births
Living people
Actresses from New Jersey
Actresses from New York City
American film actresses
American stage actresses
American television actresses
Hofstra University alumni
People from Flushing, Queens
People from Hanover Township, New Jersey
21st-century American actresses